Mieczysław Cybulski (16 March 1903 – 20 August 1984) was a Polish film actor. He appeared in more than 25 films between 1927 and 1939.

Selected filmography

 The Polish Marathon (1927)
 Sto metrów miłości (1932)
 Córka generała Pankratowa (1934)
 Młody Las (1934)
 Rapsodia Bałtyku (1935)
 Wierna rzeka (1936)
 Dodek na froncie (1936)
 Bohaterowie Sybiru (1936)
 Róża (1936)
 Bohaterowie Sybiru (1936)
 Rena (1938)
 Serce matki (1938)
 Wrzos (1938)
 Second Youth (1938)

References

External links

1903 births
1984 deaths
Polish male film actors
Polish male silent film actors
Polish emigrants to the United States
20th-century Polish male actors